Akbar Khan castle is a historical castle located in Eslamabad-e Gharb County in Kermanshah Province. The longevity of this fortress dates back to the Chalcolithic.

References 

Castles in Iran